Los Angeles Airways Flight 841 was a Sikorsky S-61 helicopter that crashed at 5:50 p.m. on  Wednesday May 22nd 1968 in the city of Paramount, California.  All twenty passengers and three crew members were killed.  The aircraft was destroyed by impact and fire.  The probable cause of the accident was a mechanical failure in the blade rotor system, which then allowed one blade to strike the side of the fuselage.  The other four blades were then thrown out of balance and all five rotor blades broke and then the rear fuselage and tail separated from the rest of the airframe.  The cause of the mechanical failure is undetermined. At the time, it was the worst helicopter-related accident in U.S. aviation history, not to be surpassed until the 1986 Grand Canyon mid-air collision which killed 25.

Los Angeles Airways (LAA) Flight 841 was a regularly scheduled passenger flight from Disneyland Heliport in Anaheim, California to Los Angeles International Airport. The flight was westbound at 2,000 feet over Paramount, California when air traffic controllers received a distress message from pilots: "L.A., we're crashing, help us."   The helicopter crashed onto a dairy farm and burst into flames.  N303Y, a Sikorsky S-61L helicopter, serial number 61060, had accumulated  12,096 total flying hours prior to the accident.

Much of the debris was contained in the dairy farm where the helicopter crashed.  The tail rotor was discovered one block east of the crash site in a used truck yard.

Among those killed was a group of nine vacationers from Ohio; a Hunt-Wesson Foods executive; the mayor of Red Bluff, California; and a University of California, Berkeley professor.

See also

 List of accidents and incidents involving commercial aircraft
 Los Angeles Airways Flight 417

References

External links
 NTSB report on Flight 841
 Los Angeles Airways Helicopter at Disneyland
 Readers recall 50 years of Disneyland
 Aviation Safety report

Aviation accidents and incidents in California
1968 in Los Angeles
Los Angeles Airways accidents and incidents
Airliner accidents and incidents caused by mechanical failure
Disasters in Los Angeles
Paramount, California
Aviation accidents and incidents in the United States in 1968
May 1968 events in the United States
Accidents and incidents involving the Sikorsky S-61